Soulwax are a Belgian electronic band and DJ/production collective from Ghent, who formed in 1995. Centred around brothers David and Stephen Dewaele, other current members include Igor and Laima Cavalera, and Stefaan Van Leuven. The group first rose to prominence following the release of their album Much Against Everyone's Advice, and have released five studio albums to date. Outside of Soulwax, the Dewaeles also perform DJ sets under the moniker 2manydjs (first known as The Fucking Dewaele Brothers/The Flying Dewaele Brothers).

The group are also known for their project Radio Soulwax. Their 2002 compilation, As Heard on Radio Soulwax Pt. 2, was named the best popular music album of 2002 by The New York Times. The brothers have also hosted a show on Belgian television, titled Alter8.

History

Career
The 2004 album Any Minute Now spawned three singles in "E Talking", "NY Excuse" and the title track. The "E Talking" music video was controversial and restricted to post-watershed broadcast on music television channels. Filmed on location in London's Fabric nightclub, everyone in the video is depicted as being on a different drug, listed from A through Z (including popular drug nicknames).

The group produced a number of official and unofficial remixes, including "Daft Punk Is Playing At My House" and "Get Innocuous!" by LCD Soundsystem, "Robot Rock" by Daft Punk and "Dare" by Gorillaz. They are friends of artists Tiga, LCD Soundsystem and WhoMadeWho. The album Nite Versions (2005) is a collection of remixes of tracks from the album Any Minute Now.

In January 2006, Soulwax released their second remix album. Titled This Is Radio Soulwax, it was covermounted into the February 2006 issue of Mixmag. Their third remix album, Part of NYE Never Dies, was also covermounted into Mixmag in late 2008.

In summer 2006, Soulwax completed a "Nite Version remix" of Gossip's "Standing in the Way of Control" as well as their "Ravelight Dub" and "Ravelight Vocal Mix" of Robbie Williams' "Lovelight". The summer 2006 tour was filmed by director Saam Farahmand, and resulted in the documentary "Part of the Weekend Never Dies".

In August 2006, Soulwax were working on tracks for the new album from Tiga. In late 2006, it was announced in Belgian magazine HUMO that David and Stephen Dewaele had formed a band with Shane Doran and his brother-in-law Fergadelic, called Die Verboten.

In 2007, Soulwax produced remixes of "Gravity's Rainbow" by Klaxons and "Phantom Pt. II" by Justice.

Soulwax, under the guise of 2manydjs, headlined their own "Radio Soulwax" tent at the Rock Ness Festival held on 9 June 2007. The following day at the festival, they played a Soulwax Nite Versions show in the "Clash Arena." Later that month, they took part in the Wild in the Country event at Knebworth Park on 30 June 2007.
In December 2007, they held Radio Soulwax-mas, a massive Christmas party in Flanders Expo, with guests such as Tiga, Erol Alkan, Boys Noize, Justice, Riton, Mixhell, Daniele Baldelli, Hong Kong Dong, Das Pop, Goose, and Milk Inc.

Soulwax produced the debut album by fellow Belgians Das Pop, fronted by Soulwax drummer Bent Van Looy, scheduled for 2009 release in the UK.

In December 2009, Soulwax produced the song "We Love Animals" for Crookers with Mixhell. In addition, Soulwax produced the song "Talk to Me" by Peaches.

In 2016, Soulwax returned with a new live show entitled "Soulwax Transient Program For Drums And Machinery". The new line up consisted of three drummers (Victoria Smith, Blake Davies and Igor Cavalera) as well as Igor's wife Laima Leyton, (also of Mixhell) on synths and backing vocals. This live show was the basis for their album From Deewee, released March 24.

As Heard on Radio Soulwax
The only official compilation As Heard on Radio Soulwax Pt. 2, was released in 2002 and is composed of 45 tracks the Dewaele brothers were able to clear the rights from. They originally requested rights for 187 tracks and got clearances for 114 of them. 62 were refused and 11 remained untraceable.

All the unofficial releases (As Heard on Radio Soulwax Pt. 1 and 3 through 11) are in fact a compilation of the Radio Soulwax shows 2manydjs did for various radio stations including Studio Brussel (Belgium), Radio 1 (UK), KISS 100 (UK) and Eins live (Germany).

VIVID Sydney 2011
As part of the Vivid Live Festival in Sydney, David and Stephen Dewaele behind 2manydjs and electro-rock outfit Soulwax presented a one-off series of radio shows on 'Triple J' Australian national radio station. The series was broadcast nationally 6 PM nightly from 31 May 2011 to 3 June 2011.

Other work
The 2001 track "Theme from Discothèque" is by David and Stephen Dewaele from Soulwax, under the name Samantha Fu. They produced this track for a Ghent-based dancegroup called Kung Fu.

On February 2, 2009, Soulwax made a guest appearance on BBC Radio 1, playing 420 song introductions in a period of 60 minutes.

Film
In 2004, Soulwax compiled the soundtrack for the Belgian movie Steve + Sky. Soulwax contributed three instrumental tracks on this compilation under the name "Kawazaki".

Soulwax's remix of the Rolling Stones' "You Can't Always Get What You Want" is the credit song of, and featured in the movie 21.

Director Saam Farahmand has filmed Soulwax on their international dates (2005–2007), capturing all the excitement, chaos and humour of the world tour. Soulwax filmed 120 shows with one camera in Europe, Japan, U.S., Latin America and Australia. This resulted in two films entitled "Part of the Weekend Never Dies"; a live music film and a documentary which includes 2manydjs, Soulwax Nite Versions and features James Murphy, Nancy Whang, Erol Alkan, Tiga, Justice, Busy P, The Naked Guy, So-Me, Peaches, Kitsuné, Klaxons and many more in behind the scenes footage, interviews, etc.
As of April 2008, Soulwax's clubbing film/documentary Radio Soulwax is finished. They performed a sold-out gig at the London Royal Festival Hall, during which they did a première of the film. It came out on DVD September 2008.

Soulwax composed the soundtrack for the 2016 film Belgica by Felix Van Groeningen, crediting every song on the soundtrack to a different fictional band.

Radio Soulwax
In 2011, Soulwax established a website called Radio Soulwax, in which a continuous mix played all day, featuring 24 hour-long mixes with visuals similar to those used in the 2manydjs live sets, and included music from many different decades. These "RSWX hours" have since been made available on Vimeo.

Soulwax - Machine was conceived and directed by Saam Farahmand, who was inspired to create an interpretation of the ethos behind the project. The result is a film featuring model Marilyn Rose that encapsulates the audio-visual obsession of Radio Soulwax, according to Soulwax themselves. The film was previsualised, edited, and post-produced by Andrew Daffy's The House of Curves in London.

Soulwax FM
Soulwax contributed to the soundtrack of Grand Theft Auto V. They hosted and supplied the playlist to the in-game radio station "Soulwax FM".

Awards and nominations
{| class=wikitable
|-
! Year !! Awards !! Work !! Category !! Result
|-
| rowspan=1|1998
| Zamu Music Awards
| Much Against Everyone's Advice
| Album cover
| 
|-
| rowspan=3|1999
| Zamu Music Awards
| Soulwax
| Live-act
| 
|-
| rowspan=2|TMF Awards
| Soulwax
| Best Belgian Rock
| 
|-
| 2 Many DJ's
| Best Belgian Video
| 
|-
| rowspan=2|2000
| rowspan=2|TMF Awards
| Soulwax
| Best Belgian Rock
| 
|-
| Much Against Everyone's Advice
| Best Belgian Video
| 
|-
| rowspan=2|2002
| Zamu Music Awards
| 2 Many DJ's
| Dance
| 
|-
| TMF Awards
| 2 Many DJ's
| Best Belgian DJ
| 
|-
| rowspan=2|2004
| Joseph Plateau Awards
| Steve + Sky
| Best Belgian Composer
| 
|-
| TMF Awards
| 2 Many DJ's
| Best Belgian DJ
| 
|-
| rowspan=2|2005
| MTV Europe Music Awards
| Soulwax
| Best Belgian Act
| 
|-
| MVPA Awards
| "E Talking"
| Best International Video
| 
|-
| rowspan=3|2007
| Rober Awards Music Poll
| Most of the Remixes
| Best Various Artists Compilation
| 
|-
| PLUG Awards
| Nite Versions
| DJ Album of the Year 
| 
|-
| DJ Awards
| 2 Many DJ's
| Breakthrough
| 
|-
| 2009
| International Dance Music Awards
| Soulwax
| Best Dance Artist (Group)
| 
|-
| rowspan=3|2011
| rowspan=2|BT Digital Music Awards
| Radio Soulwax iOS
| Best Music App
| 
|-
| Radio Soulwax
| Best Radio Show or Podcast
| 
|-
| DJ Awards
| 2ManyDJ's
| Best Eclectic House DJ
| 
|-
| 2012
| rowspan=1|UK Music Video Awards
| Radio Soulwax - "Machine"
| Best Music AD 
| 
|-
| rowspan=5| 2017
|Best Art Vinyl
| rowspan=3| From Deewee
| Best Art Vinyl 
| 
|-
| rowspan=4|Music Industry Awards
| Best Album
| 
|-
| Best Artwork
| 
|-
| rowspan=2| Soulwax
| Best Live Act
| 
|-
| Best Dance Act
| 
|-
| 2018
| rowspan=1|UK Music Video Awards
| "Is It Always Binary"
| Best Live Video
| 
|-
| 2020
| Grammy Awards
| Marie Davidson - "Work It" (Soulwax Remix)
| Best Remixed Recording
|

Discography
Adapted from Discogs.

Albums
Studio albums
 Leave the Story Untold (1996)
 Much Against Everyone's Advice (1998)
 Any Minute Now (2004)
 From Deewee (2017)
 Essential (2018)

Remix albums
 Nite Versions (2005)

Compilation albums
 This Is Radio Soulwax (2006)
 Most of the remixes... (2007)

Soundtrack albums
 Steve + Sky (2004)
 Belgica (2016)

Unofficial albums
Most of the Other Remixes...
An album with remixes that were not included in Most of the Remixes.

Singles

Production for other artists
 Tiga - Sexor (2006)
 Tiga - Ciao! (2009)
 Das Pop - Das Pop
 Peaches - "Talk to Me" (2009)
 Crookers - "We Love Animals (with Mixhell)" (2010)
 Hot Chip - Freakout/Release (2022)

Discography as 2manydjs
Official compilations
 As Heard on Radio Soulwax Pt. 2 (2002)
Unofficial compilations
These unofficial compilations are bootleg recordings of radio shows that 2manydjs did for Studio Brussel.
 12 albums - As Heard on Radio Soulwax Pt. 0 to As Heard on Radio Soulwax Pt. 11
 Hang All DJs (all volumes)

A bootleg recording of their Essential Mix for BBC Radio 1 in 2005 was released under the title 50,000,000 Soulwax Fans Can't Be Wrong.

References

External links

 
 Radio Soulwax
 Part Of The Weekend Never Dies DVD Review
 Soulwaxmas at the Brixton

Alternative dance musical groups
Ableton Live users
Belgian electronic music groups
Belgian rock music groups
Belgian DJs
Mashup artists
Musical groups established in 1995
Belgian dance music groups
Remixers
PIAS Recordings artists
Parlophone artists
Electronic dance music DJs